A LR-Diode circuit exhibits non-linear behavior and demonstrates chaotic behavior. By adjusting the amplitude of the driving frequency one can see period doubling, and eventually chaos.

See also
Chaos theory
Logistic map

References

 
 

Diodes